Muammar (also spelled in similar ways such as Ma'mar) is a masculine given name of Arabic origin meaning "long-lived". People with the name include:

Ma'mar
 Ma'mar ibn Rashid, eighth-century hadith scholar
 Ma’mar ibn ul-Muthanna, early Muslim scholar of Arabic philology
 Jamil ibn Ma'mar, classical Arabic love poet

Moammar
 Moammar Rana, Pakistani actor

Muamer
 Muamer Abdulrab, Qatari footballer
 Muamer Adžem, Bosnian professional footballer
 Muamer Avdić, Bosnian-Herzegovinian footballer
 Muamer Bačevac, Serbian politicians
 Muamer Aissa Barsham, Qatari athlete
 Muamer Hukić, German professional boxer
 Muamer Salibašić, Bosnian-Herzegovinian footballer
 Muamer Svraka, Bosnian professional footballer
 Muamer Tanković, Swedish professional footballer
 Muamer Taletović, Bosnian retired basketball player
 Muamer Vugdalič, Slovenian footballer
 Muamer Zukorlić, Serbian politician

Muammar
 Muammar Gaddafi (c. 1942–2011), former Libyan leader (1969–2011)
 Muammar Z.A., Indonesian renowned Qari

 Surname
 Abdulaziz Al Muammar (1919–1984), Saudi Arabian technocrat

Muammer
 Muammer Aksoy, Turkish politician
 Muammer Güler, Turkish civil servant
 Muammer Sun, Turkish classical composer
 Muammer Yıldırım, Turkish professional footballer
 Muammer Yilmaz, French adventurer

Moamar
Moamar al-Eryani, Minister of Tourism in Yemen
Moamar Maruhom, former mayor in the Philippines
Moamar Gaddafi, alternate spelling of Muammar Gaddafi, the late leader of Libya (1969–2011)

References 

Arabic masculine given names
Turkish masculine given names